Alberto O. Cruz (born July 10, 1971) was an American soccer player who earned one cap with the U.S. national team and played professionally in the Continental Indoor Soccer League and USISL.

Player

Youth
Cruz graduated from Archbishop Riordan High School in 1989.  He was the 1989 West Catholic Athletic League Offensive Player of the Year. and was inducted into the Riordan Athletic Hall of Fame in 2006.  He also played with the San Francisco United Soccer Club.  After graduating from Riordan, he entered Santa Clara University where he played on the men's soccer team from 1989 to 1991.  In 1989, the Broncos shared the NCAA Men's Division I Soccer Championship with the Virginia Cavaliers and finished runner-up in 1991.  Cruz holds a number of school records and league honors.  He graduated with a bachelor's degree in civil engineering in 1994.

Club
While still in high school, Cruz spent the 1988 Western Soccer Alliance season with the San Jose Earthquakes.  He was a first team All Star.  In 1994, he played for the San Jose Grizzlies in the Continental Indoor Soccer League, with the San Jose Oaks and the San Francisco All Blacks.  In 1996, he played for the Sacramento Scorpions of USISL.  Cruz played semi-professional soccer in the San Francisco Soccer Football League in 2000 and 2001 with Mezcala and 2003 with San Francisco A.C.

International
Cruz earned one cap with the U.S. national team in a 1-0 win over Jamaica on September 14, 1991.  He came on for Jorge Acosta at halftime.

Other careers
In 1996, Cruz became a program manager with the San Francisco International Airport.  In December 2006, he moved to Mead and Hunt as an airport engineer.  He now works as an airport engineer at the Bob Hope Airport.

In September 1998, Cruz became the head coach of the Archbishop Riordan High School's soccer team.  He held that position until March 2002.  In May 2007, he became a coach with the Petaluma Youth Soccer League.

References

1971 births
Living people
American soccer players
United States men's international soccer players
Continental Indoor Soccer League players
Sacramento Scorpions players
Santa Clara Broncos men's soccer players
San Francisco United All Blacks players
San Jose Earthquakes (1974–1988) players
San Jose Oaks players
USISL players
San Francisco Soccer Football League players
Western Soccer Alliance players
Association football midfielders
Soccer players from California